Moritz Richard Schomburgk (5 October 1811 – 24 March 1891), generally known as Richard Schomburgk, was a German botanist and curator of the Adelaide Botanic Garden.

Family
Schomburgk was born in Freyburg, Saxony, the son of Johann Friedrich Ludwig Schomburgk (a Lutheran minister in Thuringia), and his wife Christiane Juliane Wilhelmine (née Krippendorf).

He married Pauline Henriette Kneib (c. 1822 – 24 July 1879) at sea aboard Princess Louise. Among their children were:
Otto Heinrich Schomburgk (30 September 1857 – 1 September 1938), who held several important posts such as Chief Probation Officer with the South Australian public service. He married Ada Louise Downer, daughter of Henry Downer. They had one son, Richard, and two daughters, Pauline Louise (Mrs Curwen) and Alice Marie (Mrs Howard).
 Eldest daughter Marie Caroline Schomburgk (died 17 April 1913) married widower Rev James Sunter in Sydney on 28 May 1894.
 Second daughter Clara Louise Schomburgk married Alexander Philip on 3 November 1880.
 Youngest daughter Hermine Rosalie Schomburgk married John Herbert Evans on 8 April 1891.

His older brother, Sir Robert Hermann Schomburgk (5 June 1804 – 11 March 1865), carried out geographical, ethnological and botanical studies in South America and the West Indies (in which Schomburgk participated) and also fulfilled diplomatic missions for Great Britain in the Dominican Republic and Thailand. Another brother, Otto Alfred Carl Schomburgk (28 August 1810 – 16 August 1857), and his wife Maria Charlotte Schomburgk (née Von Selchow), arrived in South Australia with Moritz Richard Schomburgk aboard the Princess Louise in August 1849. His youngest brother, Julius Ludwig Schomburgk, (c. 1818 - 9 March 1893), was chief designer for noted Adelaide silversmith J. M. Wendt. A sister, Caroline Schomburgk ( – 15 November 1874), was the second wife of Rev. Dr. Carl Wilhelm Ludwig Muecke (16 July 1815 – 4 January 1898) of Tanunda, a fellow passenger on the Princess Louise.

Education
Schomburgk studied botany at Berlin and in the Royal Gardens at Potsdam.

Career
In 1844 he went on the Prussian-British expedition to British Guiana and Brazil, led by his brother Robert. He collected for the Museum of the University of Berlin.

Australia
After the political turmoil in Europe in 1848, he emigrated to Gawler, South Australia; and, through this, he was one of a number of influential German-speaking residents  such as William Blandowski, Ludwig Becker, Hermann Beckler, Amalie Dietrich, Diedrich Henne, Gerard Krefft, Johann Luehmann, Johann Menge, Ludwig Preiss, Carl Ludwig Christian Rümker (a.k.a. Ruemker), Richard Wolfgang Semon, George Ulrich, Eugene von Guérard, Robert von Lendenfeld, Ferdinand von Mueller, Georg von Neumayer, and Carl Wilhelmi  who brought their "epistemic traditions" to Australia, and not only became "deeply entangled with the Australian colonial project", but also "intricately involved in imagining, knowing and shaping colonial Australia" (Barrett, et al., 2018, p.2).

In 1865, he became Director of the Adelaide Botanic Garden, a position he kept until his death and was succeeded by Maurice William Holtze.

Works
He wrote Versuch einer Zusammenstellung der Flora und Fauna von Britisch-Guiana (1848).

Death
Schomburgk died in Adelaide, South Australia.

Taxon named in his honor 
Moritz Richard Schomburgk is commemorated in the scientific name of a species of Australian lizard, Ctenotus schomburgkii.
the yellowfin whiting Sillago schomburgkii Peters, 1864

See also
Hundred of Schomburgk

Notes

References
 Barrett, L., Eckstein, L., Hurley, A.W. & Schwarz A. (2018), "Remembering German-Australian Colonial Entanglement: An Introduction", Postcolonial Studies, Vol.21, No.1, (January 2018), pp.1-5. 
 Orchard, A.E. (1999) A History of Systematic Botany in Australia, in Flora of Australia Vol.1, 2nd ed., ABRS.
 Roth, Walter E. (editor and translator) (1922–1923). Richard Schomburgk’s Travels in British Guiana 1840–1844. (2 volumes). Georgetown: Daily Chronicle Office.
 "Robert Schomburgk and Richard Schomburgk" In: Taylor, Tom; Taylor, Michael (2011). Aves: A Survey of the Literature of Neotropical Ornithology. Baton Rouge: Louisiana State University Libraries.

External links

1811 births
1891 deaths
People from Freyburg, Germany
19th-century German botanists
Australian Lutherans
Explorers of Amazonia
German-Australian Forty-Eighters
People from Adelaide
Burials at North Road Cemetery
19th-century Lutherans